B46 may refer to:
 Bundesstraße 46, a German road
 B46 (New York City bus), a bus line in Brooklyn
 B46 nuclear bomb
 HLA-B46, a HLA-B serotype
 B46, the Taimanov variation of the Sicilian Defence chess opening
 Convair XB-46, an American aircraft